Hi-Skool Trivia is the debut EP released by the band Emanuel Nice, in 1999. It was released by the German label Roddog Records.

Emanuel Nice consisted of teenage musicians, Matt Breen (vocals/guitar), Bryan Whiteman (bass), Matthew Barber (guitar), and Anthony Brock (drums).

The band changed their name to Emanuel, just before being signed with Vagrant Records in late 2004.

Track listing

References

See also
Punk rock
Indie rock

1999 debut EPs
Emanuel (band) EPs
Musical groups from Louisville, Kentucky